Větrný Jeníkov is a market town in Jihlava District in the Vysočina Region of the Czech Republic. It has about 600 inhabitants.

Administrative parts
The village of Velešov is an administrative part of Větrný Jeníkov.

History
The first written mention of Větrný Jeníkov si from 1226. In 1346, the village was promoted to a market town.

References

Market towns in the Czech Republic
Populated places in Jihlava District